"Nasty" is the twenty-second single released by the British electronic band the Prodigy. The song was released on 12 January 2015, for their upcoming album The Day Is My Enemy (to come out on 30 March). The remix EP was subsequently released on 2 February.

The single was announced on 29 December 2014, on Instagram and Facebook.

Track listing

Official versions
"Nasty" (Instrumental) (4:07)

Music video
The official music video was posted on the band's YouTube page on 12 January 2015. It features a fox getting chased in an alleyway by several hunters who are about to shoot it. The fox however puts them in a trance-like state and brings them to a forest where it turns the hunters into foxes.

Charts

References

The Prodigy songs
2015 singles
Songs written by Liam Howlett
2015 songs
Cooking Vinyl singles